Luis Pizarro (born October 26, 1962) in Río Grande, Puerto Rico is a retired boxer from Puerto Rico, who competed in the men's bantamweight (– 54 kg) and featherweight division (- 57 kg) during the late 1970s and early 1980s.

He represented his native country at the 1980 Summer Olympics in Moscow, alongside two other boxers: Alberto Mercado and José Angel Molina. Pizarro captured the silver medal in the bantamweight category at the 1979 Pan American Games.

1980 Olympic results
Below is the record of Luis Pizarro, a Puerto Rican featherweight boxer who competed at the 1980 Moscow Olympics:

 Round of 64: bye
 Round of 32: defeated Jean-Pierre Mbereke-Baban (Cameroon) referee stopped contest
 Round of 16: defeated Fitzroy Brown (Guyana) by decision, 5-0
 Quarterfinal: lost to Adolfo Horta (Cuba) by decision, 0-5

References
 sports-reference

1962 births
Living people
People from Río Grande, Puerto Rico
Bantamweight boxers
Featherweight boxers
Boxers at the 1980 Summer Olympics
Olympic boxers of Puerto Rico
Puerto Rican male boxers
Boxers at the 1979 Pan American Games
Pan American Games silver medalists for Puerto Rico
Pan American Games medalists in boxing
Medalists at the 1979 Pan American Games
20th-century Puerto Rican people